Puerto Rico Highway 16 (PR-16) is an urban road in Santurce, Puerto Rico.

Route description
This is a short road parallel to PR-1 (Expreso Luis Muñoz Rivera), near to the western part of PR-26 (Expreso Román Baldorioty de Castro). This road intersects with PR-35 (Avenida Manuel Fernández Juncos) and provides access to Puerto Rico Convention Center and Fernando Luis Ribas Dominicci Airport. This road is called Boulevard Román Baldorioty de Castro.

Major intersections

See also

 List of highways numbered 16

References

External links
 

016
Roads in San Juan, Puerto Rico